The Geely GX9 is a mid-size crossover SUV produced by the Chinese automaker Geely.

Overview 
The GX9 is Geely's first 7-seater crossover and it was originally previewed as a concept in 2009, and was called the Emgrand EX8 in 2010, then renamed to Geely GX9 in 2014 and finally reached the market as Haoqing GX9. The GX9 was shown during the Shanghai Autoshow in 2013 as the Emgrand EX8 semi-concept, and production started in early 2014 as the GX9 of Geely after being unveiled during the 2014 Beijing Autoshow. The final production car has prices ranging from 100,000 to 150,000 yuan. The Geely GX9 SUV achieved a five star result in the C-NCAP crash test.

Powertrain
Power of the Geely GX9 comes from a 2.4 petrol engine or a 2.0 turbodiesel engine for export. The four-cylinder gasoline engine produces a maximum 162 hp and 210 nm, mated to a six-speed automatic transmission or a 5-speed manual transmission.

References

External links 
 Official website (China)

Haoyue
Cars introduced in 2014
2010s cars
Mid-size sport utility vehicles
Crossover sport utility vehicles
Front-wheel-drive vehicles
All-wheel-drive vehicles
Cars of China